Jeffrey Allen may refer to:

Arts and entertainment
Jeffery Renard Allen (born 1962), poet and author
Jeffrey Allen, musician in R&B band Mint Condition
Jeff Allen (musician) (born 1946), English drummer
Jeff Allen (comedian) (born 1956), American comedian and film actor
Jeff Allen, musician in swing revival band Alien Fashion Show

Sports
Jeff Allen (basketball) (born 1987), American basketball player
Jeff Allen (defensive back) (born 1958), American and Canadian football defensive back
Jeff Allen (offensive lineman) (born 1990), American football offensive guard
Jeff Allan (born 1957), Canadian ice hockey defenceman

See also
Geoffrey Allen (disambiguation)